The Bestuzhev Courses in Saint Petersburg were the largest and most prominent women's higher education institution in Imperial Russia.

The institute opened its doors in 1878. It was named after Konstantin Bestuzhev-Ryumin, the  first director. Other professors included Baudouin de Courtenay, Alexander Borodin, Faddei Zielinski, Dmitry Mendeleyev, Ivan Sechenov, and Sergey Platonov. An assistant professor there was Vera Bogdanovskaya, the first female chemist to die as a result of her own research. Nadezhda Krupskaya and Maria Piłsudska were among the graduates. The courses occupied a purpose-built edifice on Vasilievsky Island.

After the Russian Revolution, they were reorganized as the Third University of Petrograd, which was merged into the Petrograd University in September 1919.

See also
 Guerrier Courses

References

External links 
 "Women’s higher education institution (Bestuzhev Courses) opened in St. Petersburg 135 years ago" - Yeltzin Presidential Library
 

Education in Russia
Former women's universities and colleges
Universities in Saint Petersburg
1878 establishments in the Russian Empire
1918 disestablishments in Russia